The English Spelling Society is an international organisation, based in the United Kingdom. It was founded in 1908  as the Simplified Spelling Society. It primarily aims to raise awareness of problems caused by English spelling's irregularity and to improve literacy and reduce learning costs, including through the use of spelling reform. The Society publishes leaflets, newsletters, journals, books, and bulletins. Its spokespeople feature regularly on TV, radio, and in print.

Structure
The Society is based in the United Kingdom, but has a worldwide membership, including Ireland, the United States, Canada, Australia and New Zealand. It is governed by a committee elected at its Annual General Meeting. The Society maintains links with the American Literacy Council, which has similar objectives.

Aims
The English Spelling Society primarily aims to make known the problems caused by English spelling's irregularity in an effort to improve literacy and reduce learning costs, including through the use of spelling reform. It also wishes to raise awareness of the alphabetic principle and its "corruption during the long history of written English" and to prepare a graded set of proposals for a more regular English orthography.

The Society believes that both recent research and the continuing governmental concern about literacy rates in the English-speaking world strengthen its position. In particular, it points to evidence that Anglophone children have a harder time learning to read and write than do Italian children. It also quotes evidence that dyslexia is less of a problem in Italy and linguistically similar countries which have more phonemic writing systems than English. Finally, it points to a recent study by the KPMG Foundation that estimates the total costs to the public purse till age 37 arising from failure to read in the primary school years at £1.73 billion to £2.05 billion a year.

Specific reform systems
As of September 2021, the Society has not endorsed any specific alternative English spelling system. However, through its "Personal View" series, it provides a forum for authors of alternative systems to publish their work and submit them to peer review. The forum includes resources for Simple-Fonetik and SoundSpel, among others. Its listed proposals vary in their recommendations from regularising only a few words to making English almost completely phonemically written.

In the November 1983 edition of the Society's newsletter, it printed a five-part reform proposal called "Stage 1". One of these was Harry Lindgren's SR1 proposal. In April 1984, SR1 was adopted as the Society's house style at its yearly meeting. The Society said that the newsletter's proposed reforms could be used either together or individually (as a step-by-step change).

In April 2021, Stephen Linstead's Traditional Spelling Revised (TSR) was approved by the International English Spelling Congress as the best alternative to English Orthography. The Society, sponsor of the Congress, is affording TSR a degree of support and publicity.

Spelling bee protests
Protesters from the Society have regularly taken good-humoured action against orthodox English spelling and its promotion (e.g. by demonstrating, most conspicuously in the form of 'BeeMan,' at the annual Scripps National Spelling Bee in Washington, D.C.).

Books
 Jolly Dictionary - Sue Lloyd and Sara Wernham
 Future of Fonics - Isobel Raven
 Spelling for the 21st century - Sanford S. Silverman
 Spelling Dearest (The Down and Dirty, Nitty-Gritty History of English Spelling) - Niall McLeod Waldman
 The Book of Spells & Misspells - Valerie Yule
 Lets End Our Literacy Crisis - Bob C. Cleckler

See also

 
List of reforms of the English language
Orthography
Spelling reform
Defective script
"The Chaos" (poem demonstrating irregular English spelling)
Linguistic conservatism
Linguistic prescription
Traditional Spelling Revised

References

External links
Spelling Society Home page
American Literacy Council
The History of English Spelling Reform 
Children of the Code

English spelling reform
Educational organisations based in the United Kingdom
1908 establishments in the United Kingdom
Organizations established in 1908